Mário Custódio Nazaré or simply Marinho (born April 1, 1976 in Santos, São Paulo), is a Brazilian footballer who currently plays for Ponte Preta. In 2002, he signed for Beşiktaş but his contract was terminated just 15 days later.

Honours

Grêmio

Rio Grande do Sul State League: 2001
Brazilian Cup: 2001

Corinthians

Brazilian League: 2005

External links
 sambafoot
 CBF
 zerozero.pt
 globoesporte
 placar
 Guardian Stats Centre

1976 births
Living people
Sportspeople from Santos, São Paulo
Brazilian footballers
Associação Atlética Portuguesa (Santos) players
Guarani FC players
Grêmio Foot-Ball Porto Alegrense players
Beşiktaş J.K. footballers
Associação Atlética Ponte Preta players
Club Athletico Paranaense players
Sport Club Corinthians Paulista players
Association football defenders